The Dimboola Football Club, nicknamed the Roos, is an Australian rules football and netball club based in the town of Dimboola, Victoria. The football team competes in the Wimmera Football League (WFL).

History

Dimboola joined the Wimmera District Football League in 1923. In 1932 during the height of the Great depression the small town clubs suffering from financial pressures tried to get the league to change the way the gate taking were distributed to the clubs. The larger town clubs, knowing that they would be disadvantaged, blocked the motion. Nhill and Dimboola both went into recess.

In 1933 Dimboola was back, it formed the Mid Wimmera FL with Minyip, Murtoa, Nhill and Rupanyip. It won the 1933 and 1935 premierships.
While the WDFL approached the Ballarat Football League to merge hoping that greater interest and better football would cause larger gate takings, so in 1934 the Wimmera FL and the Ballarat FL merged to form the Ballarat Wimmera FL. After three years in which the Wimmera clubs faced with greater costs and constantly losing on the footy field, feelers were put out to the smaller clubs, now playing in the Mid Wimmera FL. A peace deal was settled in September 1936 and the Wimmera Football League was reformed in 1937 making it a nine team competition.

Controversies

Notable players
Bert Rankin - ex-captain of the Geelong Football Club
Larry Watson - , 
Tim Watson - 
Ernest Mucklow - Port Adelaide
Jack Baggott - Richmond

Bibliography 
Wheatbelt Warriors. A Tribute To Wimmera Football League.

References

External links

Official Facebook

Wimmera Football League clubs
Netball teams in Victoria (Australia)